Mexico–Norway relations are the diplomatic relations between Mexico and Norway. Both nations are members of the Organisation for Economic Co-operation and Development and the United Nations.

History
Norway recognized Mexico after the latter obtained its independence from Spain in 1821. At the time, Norway was part of the Union between Sweden and Norway. Mexico and the Union established diplomatic relations in 1885. The union disbanded in 1905 and Norway became an independent nation. In 1906, Mexico established diplomatic relations with Norway.

In 1910 Norway established an embassy in Mexico City and Mexico would established an embassy in Oslo a few years later. Early relations were mainly between Norwegian fishing vessels that would arrive to Veracruz to trade in cod. During World War II, Mexico maintained diplomatic relations with the Norwegian government in exile. After the war, both nations re-opened their embassies, respectively. 

In 1968, Crown Prince and future King of Norway, Harald V paid an official visit to Mexico. Since the initial visit, there have been several high-level visits between both nations. In June 2002, Mexico closed its embassy in Oslo due to financial restraints. The Mexican embassy was re-opened in 2014.

In April 2018, Norwegian Prime Minister Erna Solberg paid a visit to Mexico and met with President Enrique Peña Nieto. While in Mexico, the two leaders discussed the joint work undertaken by their governments to strengthen political dialogue and identify new opportunities for collaboration in the energy and multilateral spheres.

In February 2023, Norwegian Foreign Minister Anniken Huitfeldt paid a visit to Mexico and met with her counterpart Marcelo Ebrard.

High-level visits
High-level visits from Mexico to Norway
 Foreign Minister Patricia Espinosa (2011)
 Foreign Minister Luis Videgaray Caso (2017)

High-level visits from Norway to Mexico
 Crown Prince Harald (1968)
 Prime Minister Kjell Magne Bondevik (2002)
 Crown Prince Haakon (2009, 2012)
 Prime Minister Jens Stoltenberg (April and December 2010)
 Prime Minister Erna Solberg (2018)
 Foreign Minister Anniken Huitfeldt (2023)

Bilateral agreements
Both nations have signed several bilateral agreements such as an Agreement on Cultural exchanges (1980); Agreement on the Avoidance of Double-taxation and Tax Evasion (1995); Agreement on Agriculture Cooperation (2000) and an Agreement on Fishing and Aquaculture Cooperation (2018).

Transportation
There are direct flights between Cancún International Airport and Oslo Airport, Gardermoen with TUI Airways.

Trade
In 2001, Mexico signed a free trade agreement with the European Free Trade Association member nations (which includes Norway). In 2018, two-way trade between both nations amounted to US$229 million. Mexico's main exports to Norway include: iron and steel pipes, parts for turbojet engines, turboprops and other gas turbines and malt beer. Norway's main exports to Mexico include: mineral and chemical fertilizers, petroleum gas and gaseous hydrocarbons, and dried, salted or brine fish. Both nations are major petroleum producing nations. Mexican multinational companies such as Cemex and Mexichem operate in Norway. Norwegian multinational companies Equinor and Norsk Hydro operate in Mexico.

Resident diplomatic missions
 Mexico has an embassy in Oslo.
 Norway has an embassy in Mexico City.

See also
 Scandinavian Mexicans

References

 
Norway
Bilateral relations of Norway